Cyperus neoguinensis is a species of sedge that is endemic to New Guinea.

The species was first formally described by the botanist Georg Kükenthal in 1924.

See also
 List of Cyperus species

References

neoguinensis
Flora of New Guinea
Plants described in 1924
Taxa named by Georg Kükenthal